Pobre Rico Pobre is a Mexican telenovela, based on the Colombian telenovela Nuevo Rico Nuevo Pobre. The show started 21 April 2008.

Plot
The comedy deals with the life of Andrés Ferreira and Brayan Galindo, from rich and poor families respectively. A mistake was made when they were born, because Andrés, originally of the poor family, was given to the rich family, and Brayan of the rich family went with the poor family. 30 years later the nurse who made the mistake reveals the truth to the families, and Brayan goes to live with the rich family, and Andres goes with the poor family.

Cultural aspects
The name of Brayan Galindo reflects an irregular adaptation of Brian to the Spanish, just as Rosmery is adapted from the original Rosemary. It reflects the fact that many Latin Americans adopt foreign names thinking that it is an indication of socioeconomic status.

The use of earpieces bluetooth in permanent form and cellular an intelligent Treo 650 by Andrés Ferreira tries to accentuate its characteristic Yuppies.  Andrés is portrayed as a very arrogant person, who gives no vacations on Christmas to his employees and ignores his mother's advice.  So his mother wants to give a lesson to Andrés by exchanging Brayan's and Andrés' roles.  During this event Andrés falls  in love with Rosmery while Brayan breaks his relationship with her because he has begun an affaire with María Fernanda, a super-model fortune-hunter who was Andrés' girlfriend.

The social consequences of massive dismissals of 200 employees as result of a reconstruction inserts a dramatic effect in the plot, and contribute to create a cold image of the enterprise world and Andrés Ferreira.

Cast

 Héctor Arredondo - Andrés Ferreira 
 Cinthia Vázquez - Rosmery Peláez 
 Patricia Vásquez - Fernanda San Miguel 
 Victor Garcia - Brayan Galindo 
 Patricia Bernal - Antonia Vda. de Ferreira 
 Luis Felipe Tovar - Leónidas Galindo 
 América Gabriel - Maritza Buenahora 
 Andrea Marti - Ingrid Peláez
 Plutarco Haza - Maximiliano López Ferreira.

External links
 TV Azteca official site 
 

2008 telenovelas
2008 Mexican television series debuts
2009 Mexican television series endings
Mexican telenovelas
TV Azteca telenovelas
Mexican television series based on Colombian television series
Spanish-language telenovelas